Premier High School is a public charter high school in Phoenix, Arizona United States.

References

External links

Public high schools in Arizona
Charter schools in Arizona